António Tavares (born 31 May 1932) is a Portuguese former sports shooter. He competed in the 50 metre rifle, three positions event at the 1960 Summer Olympics.

References

1932 births
Living people
Portuguese male sport shooters
Olympic shooters of Portugal
Shooters at the 1960 Summer Olympics
Sportspeople from Lisbon